Pierre de Boissat (1603 in Vienne, Isère – 28 March 1662) was a soldier, writer, poet and translator.

Knight and Count Palatine, Boissat began his career in the military. He was one of the first members of the Académie française, and first to occupy the Academy's seat 31 in 1634.  Boissat translated Les fables d'Esope Phrygien, illustrées de Discours moraux, philosophiques et politiques, published in 1633 by his friend Jean Baudoin, used by Jean de La Fontaine. He is also attributed with Une Morale chrétienne and Une Histoire négropontique. His home, l'hôtel Pierre de Boissat, on rue des Orfèvres in Vienne, département Isère  (France) exists today as an historic monument.

External links
 

1603 births
1662 deaths
Writers from Vienne, Isère
French soldiers
17th-century French writers
17th-century French male writers
French translators
Members of the Académie Française
French male non-fiction writers
17th-century French translators